Henry George Valencia Brauner (born 10 May 1984 in Quezon City) is a Filipino football coach and former player who played as a central midfielder. Since February 2020, Brauner is the director of player development for Seattle Sounders FC of the American Major League Soccer.

Career

College and amateur 
Brauner grew up in Tucson, Arizona and played college soccer at Pima College, Worcester State College - where he was named to the All-MASCAC men's soccer team in 2005 and the University of Arizona club team.

He played for the New Hampshire Phantoms in the USL Premier Development League in 2008, and moved west to play for Ventura County Fusion in the PDL for the 2009 season.

International 
Brauner was called up to the Philippines squad for the 2007 ASEAN Football Championship qualifying tournament in November 2006.  Although he was not able to take part due to passport problems.  He later won the Filipino player of the decade in 2007.

The Philippines would go on to qualify for the tournament proper of the 2007 ASEAN Football Championship and Brauner was again selected to be part of the squad.  As part of the Philippines' preparations for the tournament, a friendly match was scheduled against Singapore on 7 January 2007.  He then made his debut in that match, coming on as an 87th-minute substitute, and is his only appearance for the Philippines to date.

References

External links 

1984 births
Living people
American soccer players
Arizona Wildcats men's soccer players
Association football midfielders
Filipino footballers
Filipino expatriate footballers
Footballers from Metro Manila
Philippines international footballers
Real Salt Lake non-playing staff
Seacoast United Phantoms players
Soccer players from Tucson, Arizona
Sportspeople from Quezon City
USL League Two players
Ventura County Fusion players